The history of the Jews in Wales begins in the 13th century. However, shortly after the English conquest of Wales, Edward I issued the 1290 Edict of Expulsion expelling the Jews from England. From then until the formal return of the Jews to England in 1655, there is only one mention of Jews on Welsh soil.

Jewish communities were recorded in the 18th century, while major Jewish settlement dates from the 19th century.

Middle Ages

Like the rest of Western Europe, medieval Wales was Christian.

The clergyman and author Gerald of Wales (c. 1146 – c. 1223) wrote an account of his journey through Wales in 1188 in order to recruit soldiers for the Third Crusade, the Itinerarium Cambriae (1191). In it, he makes no reference to Jews in Wales, while including an allegorical narrative concerning a Jew and a Christian priest travelling in Shropshire, England.

During the thirteenth century there are records of Jews in Abergavenny, Caerleon and Chepstow, all of which were in the Marcher Lordships of south Wales.

It is likely that most if not all Jews left Wales after Edward I's act of 1290, although the writ of the English king would not have run in many of the Marcher Lordships. The Welsh chronicle Brut y Tywysogion refers to the act but only in the context of the Jews in neighbouring England. There is a record of an unnamed Jew in the commote of Manor Deilo in Carmarthenshire (outside the Marcher Lordships) in 1386/7.

Early modern period
In England, between 1290 and their formal return to that country in 1655, there are no other official traces of Jews as such except in connection with the Domus Conversorum, which kept a number of Jews who had converted to Christianity within its precincts up to 1551 and even later. There is no comparable evidence for Wales.

The BBC notes, "The oldest non-Christian faith [in Wales] to be established was Judaism, with a presence in Swansea dating from around 1730. Jewish communities were formed in the next century in Cardiff, Merthyr Tydfil, Pontypridd and Tredegar."

Modern period

The rapid expansion of the coal mining industry in the 19th century led to major economic growth and a vast increase in immigration to Wales. The Jews immigrated to Wales in large numbers, leading to the founding of new Jewish communities, particularly in the heavily industrialized South Wales Valleys. While the Cardiff Jewish population was 13 families in 1852, after the influx of Jews fleeing from Russian pogroms in the 1880s the city's Jewish population rose to a peak of 5,500. A synagogue was founded in Merthyr Tydfil in 1875, and by the end of the century, most towns in the Valleys had small Jewish communities and trading stations. Generally, these communities appear to have been well tolerated, though there were some notable exceptions. In 1911, antisemitic sentiment came to a head in the Tredegar area, where working-class mobs attacked Jewish-owned businesses, causing thousands of pounds worth of damage. Early 20th-century Welsh Jewish society is featured in the 1999 film Solomon & Gaenor, which is set at the time of the Tredegar riots.

Some of these topics were covered in the documentary The Kosher Comedian presented by Jewish-Welsh writer comedian Bennett Arron.

Jewish communities continue to be substantial in Wales, being augmented by refugees from Nazi-dominated Europe in the late 1930s. See also Jews escaping from Nazi Europe to Britain.

The modern community in South Wales is centred on the Cardiff Reform Synagogue and the Cardiff United Synagogue. There is also a synagogue in Swansea. The synagogue of Merthyr Tydfil, the major one north of Cardiff, ceased to hold regular services in the 1970s and was later sold. It is a listed building and, while there is planning permission to convert it into flats, there are calls for it to be moved to the National Museum of Wales at St Fagans, near Cardiff.

The Welsh Jewish community held numerically steady between the 2011 and 2021 censuses.

Notable people
Notable people of Welsh-Jewish background include:
 Louis Barnett Abrahams
 Dannie Abse
 Leo Abse
 Wilfred Abse
 Bennett Arron
 David Baddiel
 Isaac Cohen
 Sacha Baron Cohen, father Gerald of Welsh-Jewish origin
 Maurice Edelman
 Raymond Garlick
 David Glick
 Albert Gubay
 Michael Howard
 David Jacobs
 Joe Jacobson
 Barnett Janner
 Greville Janner
 Brian Josephson
 Denise Levertov
 Susan Mendus
 Michael Moritz
 Lucy Owen
 Jon Ronson
 Bernice Rubens
 Norman Solomon
 Lord Stone of Hendon, Dr Sir Joseph Ellis Stone
 Lord Ashdown of Chelwood
 Sara Sugarman

See also
 Jewish history
 Judaism by country

References

Further reading
Books
Bermant, C. (1969) Troubled Eden: an Anatomy of British Jewry; pp. 59–61. London: Vallentine Mitchell
 Davies, G. (ed.) The Chosen People: Wales and the Jews. Seren (March 1, 2002)  
Henriques, U. R. Q. (ed.) (1993) The Jews of South Wales: Historical Studies. Cardiff: University of Wales Press
Parry-Jones, C. (2017) The Jews of Wales: A History. Cardiff: University of Wales Press
Roth, C. (1950) The Rise of Provincial Jewry, 1950, p. 104 (Susser Archive – available on-line)
Jordan, G., Heyman, C., Lavine, E., Parry-Jones, C., Soffa, D. & Weedon, C. (eds.) (2012) Hineni: Life Portraits from a Jewish Community. Cardiff: Butetown History & Arts Centre

Articles and miscellanea
 "The Jewish Communities of South Wales".  Shemot  July 1994 vol. 2/3
 "The Jewish of Merthyr Tydfil".  Shemot September 1998 vol. 6/3
 "A Vanished Community – Merthyr Tydfil, 1830–1998"  September 2001 vol. 9/3
 Mars, Leonard "Celebrating diverse identities, person, work and place in South Wales"; in Identity and Affect: Experiences in a Globalising World, Campbell, J. R. & Rew, A., eds. London: Pluto, 1999, pp. 251–274 (This is about a Jewish doctor who was a member of the Swansea community)
 Mars, Leonard "Cooperation and Conflict between Veteran and Immigrant Jews in Swansea", in:  Religion and Power, Decline and Growth: sociological analyses of religion in Britain, Poland and the Americas, [London]: British Sociological Association, Sociology of Religion Study Group, 1991, by Peter Gee & John Fulton, eds.; pp. 115–130
Alderman, G. "The Jew as Scapegoat? the settlement and reception of Jews in South Wales before 1914", in: Trans JHSE; XXVI (1977)
 James, E. Wyn, ‘ “A’r Byd i Gyd yn Bapur . . .’ Rhan 3: Dylanwadau Rhyngwladol – Sansgrit a Hebraeg’, Canu Gwerin: Journal of the Welsh Folk-Song Society, 27 (2004), 34–47 ISSN 0967-0599.
 Stephenson, David, 'Jewish presence in, and absence from, Wales in the twelfth and thirteenth centuries', Jewish Historical Studies, 43 (2011), 7–20
 Cardiff Jewish Roll of Honour WW1, based on 1919 Western Mail
 Association of Jewish Ex-Servicemen and Women (AJEX) consecration and unveiling of War Memorial 1939–1945 at Cathedral Road Synagogue

External links
Modern Welsh Jewish communities